Cavium was a fabless semiconductor company based in San Jose, California, specializing in ARM-based and MIPS-based network, video and security processors and SoCs. The company was co-founded in 2000 by Syed B. Ali and M. Raghib Hussain, who were introduced to each other by a Silicon Valley entrepreneur. Cavium offers processor- and board-level products targeting routers, switches, appliances, storage and servers.

The company went public in May 2007 with about 175 employees. As of 2011, following numerous acquisitions, it had about 850 employees worldwide, of whom about 250 were located at company headquarters in San Jose.

Cavium was acquired by Marvell Technology Group on July 6, 2018.

History

Name change
On June 17, 2011, Cavium Networks, Inc. changed their name to Cavium, Inc.

Acquisitions

Acquisition
In November 2017, Cavium's board of directors agreed to the company's purchase by Marvell Technology Group for $6 billion in cash and stock. The merger was finalized on July 6, 2018.

References

Semiconductor companies of the United States
Networking companies of the United States
Companies formerly listed on the Nasdaq
Companies based in San Jose, California
Electronics companies established in 2001
American companies established in 2001
Fabless semiconductor companies
2018 mergers and acquisitions
American corporate subsidiaries